{{DISPLAYTITLE:C3H7I}}
The molecular formula C3H7I (molar mass: 169.99 g/mol, exact mass: 169.9592 u) may refer to:

 Isopropyl iodide
 n-Propyl iodide (also 1-propyl iodide or 1-iodopropane)